The 1998 Central Michigan Chippewas football team was an American football team that represented Central Michigan University in the Mid-American Conference (MAC) during the 1998 NCAA Division I-A football season. In their fifth season under head coach Dick Flynn, the Chippewas compiled a 6–5 record (5–3 against MAC opponents), finished in third place in the MAC's West Division, and were outscored by their opponents, 253 to 229. The team played its home games in Kelly/Shorts Stadium in Mount Pleasant, Michigan, with attendance of 101,814 in five home games.

The team's statistical leaders included Pete Shepherd with 2,005 passing yards, Eric Flowers with 1,302 rushing yards, and Reggie Allen with 832 receiving yards. Flowers also had the longest run in Central Michigan history (98 yards) against Ball State on November 21, 1998.  Flowers was also selected as the team's most valuable player. Defensive tackle Jonathan McCall and flanker Reggie Allen were both selected as first-team All-MAC players.

Schedule

References

Central Michigan
Central Michigan Chippewas football seasons
Central Michigan Chippewas football